Timothy Yang or Yang Chin-tien (born 1 July 1942) is a Taiwanese diplomat and former Minister of Foreign Affairs and Secretary-General to the President of the Republic of China, serving under President Ma Ying-Jeou.

Early life
Yang was born in Ershui, Changhua County and earned his bachelor's degree in diplomacy at the National Chengchi University.

Foreign Minister of the Republic of China (Taiwan)
When veteran diplomat Francisco Ou resigned with the Cabinet of Premier Liu Chao-Shiuan in September 2009, President Ma Ying-Jeou named Yang to the post, to serve in the newly formed Cabinet of incoming Premier Wu Den-yih. Prior to becoming Foreign Minister, Yang served as representative to Ireland, Australia, and Indonesia. As Minister of Foreign Affairs he also holds the position of vice-chairman within the Taiwan Foundation for Democracy.

ROC Presidential Office Secretary-General

ROC Presidential Office Building Truck Attack
Commenting on the truck attack to the ROC Presidential Office Building in January 2014, Yang said that a team will be established and charged with improving security around the building.

See also
 President of the Republic of China

References

Living people
1942 births
Taiwanese Ministers of Foreign Affairs
Representatives of Taiwan to Ireland
Politicians of the Republic of China on Taiwan from Changhua County
Kuomintang politicians in Taiwan
National Chengchi University alumni
Representatives of Taiwan to Indonesia
Representatives of Taiwan to Australia